Edward Charles Mickey (January 3, 1836 - ?) was a Reconstruction era legislator in South Carolina. His occupation was listed as tailor and minister. He served in the South Carolina House of Representatives from 1868 until 1872. He was one of many African American legislators who served as Republicans in South Carolina's House and Senate in 1868. He represented Charleston County. He was born in Charleston, South Carolina.

References

People from Charleston, South Carolina
African-American state legislators in Georgia (U.S. state)
Members of the Georgia House of Representatives
Georgia (U.S. state) state senators
1836 births
Year of death missing